

Events

Pre-1600
 686 – Maya king Yuknoom Yich'aak K'ahk' assumes the crown of Calakmul.
1043 – Edward the Confessor is crowned King of England.
1077 – The Patriarchate of Friûl, the first Friulian state, is created.
1559 – The second of two the treaties making up the Peace of Cateau-Cambrésis is signed, ending the Italian Wars.

1601–1900
1721 – Robert Walpole becomes, in effect, the first Prime Minister of Great Britain, though he himself denied that title.
1851 – Rama IV is crowned King of Thailand after the death of his half-brother, Rama III.
1860 – The first successful United States Pony Express run from St. Joseph, Missouri, to Sacramento, California, begins.
1865 – American Civil War: Union forces capture Richmond, Virginia, the capital of the Confederate States of America.
1882 – American Old West: Robert Ford kills Jesse James.
1885 – Gottlieb Daimler is granted a German patent for a light, high-speed, four-stroke engine, which he uses seven months later to create the world's first motorcycle, the Daimler Reitwagen.
1888 – Jack the Ripper: The first of 11 unsolved brutal murders of women committed in or near the impoverished Whitechapel district in the East End of London, occurs.
1895 – The trial in the libel case brought by Oscar Wilde begins, eventually resulting in his imprisonment on charges of homosexuality.

1901–present
1920 – Attempts are made to carry out the failed assassination attempt on General Mannerheim, led by Aleksander Weckman by order of Eino Rahja, during the White Guard parade in Tampere, Finland.
1922 – Joseph Stalin becomes the first General Secretary of the Communist Party of the Soviet Union.
1933 – First flight over Mount Everest, the British Houston-Mount Everest Flight Expedition, led by the Marquis of Clydesdale and funded by Lucy, Lady Houston.
1936 – Bruno Richard Hauptmann is executed for the kidnapping and death of Charles Augustus Lindbergh, Jr., the infant son of pilot Charles Lindbergh.
1942 – World War II: Japanese forces begin an assault on the United States and Filipino troops on the Bataan Peninsula.
1946 – Japanese Lt. General Masaharu Homma is executed in the Philippines for leading the Bataan Death March.
1948 – Cold War: U.S. President Harry S. Truman signs the Marshall Plan, authorizing $5 billion in aid for 16 countries.
  1948   – In Jeju Province, South Korea, a civil-war-like period of violence and human rights abuses begins known as the Jeju uprising.
1955 – The American Civil Liberties Union announces it will defend Allen Ginsberg's book Howl against obscenity charges.
1956 – Hudsonville–Standale tornado: The western half of the Lower Peninsula of Michigan is struck by a deadly F5 tornado.
1968 – Martin Luther King Jr. delivers his "I've Been to the Mountaintop" speech; he was assassinated the next day.
1969 – Vietnam War: United States Secretary of Defense Melvin Laird announces that the United States will start to "Vietnamize" the war effort.
1973 – Martin Cooper of Motorola makes the first handheld mobile phone call to Joel S. Engel of Bell Labs.
1974 – The 1974 Super Outbreak occurs, the second largest tornado outbreak in recorded history (after the 2011 Super Outbreak). The death toll is 315, with nearly 5,500 injured.
1975 – Vietnam War: Operation Babylift, a mass evacuation of children in the closing stages of the war begins.
  1975   – Bobby Fischer refuses to play in a chess match against Anatoly Karpov, giving Karpov the title of World Champion by default.
1980 – US Congress restores a federal trust relationship with the 501 members of the Shivwits, Kanosh, Koosharem, and the Indian Peaks and Cedar City bands of the Paiute people of Utah.
1981 – The Osborne 1, the first successful portable computer, is unveiled at the West Coast Computer Faire in San Francisco.
1989 – The US Supreme Court upholds the jurisdictional rights of tribal courts under the Indian Child Welfare Act of 1978 in Mississippi Choctaw Band v. Holyfield.
1993 – The outcome of the Grand National horse race is declared void for the first (and only) time 
1996 – Suspected "Unabomber" Theodore Kaczynski is captured at his Montana cabin in the United States.
  1996   – A United States Air Force Boeing T-43 crashes near Dubrovnik Airport in Croatia, killing 35, including Secretary of Commerce Ron Brown.
1997 – The Thalit massacre begins in Algeria; all but one of the 53 inhabitants of Thalit are killed by guerrillas.
2000 – United States v. Microsoft Corp.: Microsoft is ruled to have violated United States antitrust law by keeping "an oppressive thumb" on its competitors.
2004 – Islamic terrorists involved in the 2004 Madrid train bombings are trapped by the police in their apartment and kill themselves.
2007 – Conventional-Train World Speed Record: A French TGV train on the LGV Est high speed line sets an official new world speed record.
2008 – ATA Airlines, once one of the ten largest U.S. passenger airlines and largest charter airline, files for bankruptcy for the second time in five years and ceases all operations.
  2008   – Texas law enforcement cordons off the FLDS's YFZ Ranch. Eventually 533 women and children will be taken into state custody.
2009 – Jiverly Antares Wong opens fire at the American Civic Association immigration center in Binghamton, New York, killing thirteen and wounding four before committing suicide.
2010 – Apple Inc. released the first generation iPad, a tablet computer.
2013 – More than 50 people die in floods resulting from record-breaking rainfall in La Plata and Buenos Aires, Argentina.
2016 – The Panama Papers, a leak of legal documents, reveals information on 214,488 offshore companies.
2017 – A bomb explodes in the St Petersburg metro system, killing 14 and injuring several more people.
2018 – YouTube headquarters shooting: A 38-year-old gunwoman opens fire at YouTube Headquarters in San Bruno, California, injuring 3 people before committing suicide.

Births

Pre-1600
1016 – Xing Zong, Chinese emperor (d. 1055)
1151 – Igor Svyatoslavich, Russian prince (d. 1202)
1395 – George of Trebizond, Greek philosopher, scholar and humanist (d. 1486) 
1438 – John III of Egmont, Dutch nobleman (d. 1516)
1529 – Michael Neander, German mathematician and astronomer (d. 1581)
1540 – Maria de' Medici, Italian noblewoman, the eldest daughter of Cosimo I de' Medici, Grand Duke of Tuscany and Eleonora di Toledo. (d. 1557)
1593 – George Herbert, English poet (d. 1633)

1601–1900
1643 – Charles V, duke of Lorraine (d. 1690)
1682 – Valentin Rathgeber, German organist and composer (d. 1750)
1693 – George Edwards, English ornithologist and entomologist (d. 1773)
1715 – William Watson, English physician, physicist, and botanist (d. 1787)
1764 – John Abernethy, English surgeon and anatomist (d. 1831)
1769 – Christian Günther von Bernstorff, Danish-Prussian politician and diplomat (d. 1835)
1770 – Theodoros Kolokotronis, Greek general (d. 1843)
1778 – Pierre Bretonneau, French doctor who performed the first successful tracheotomy (d. 1862)
1781 – Swaminarayan, Indian religious leader (d. 1830)
1782 – Alexander Macomb, American general (d. 1841)
1783 – Washington Irving, American short story writer, essayist, biographer, historian (d. 1859)
1791 – Anne Lister, English diarist, mountaineer, and traveller (d.1840)
1798 – Charles Wilkes, American admiral, geographer, and explorer (d.1877)
1807 – Mary Carpenter, English educational and social reformer (d. 1877)
1814 – Lorenzo Snow, American religious leader, 5th President of The Church of Jesus Christ of Latter-day Saints (d. 1901)
1822 – Edward Everett Hale, American minister, historian, and author (d. 1909)
1823 – George Derby, American lieutenant and journalist (d. 1861)
  1823   – William M. Tweed, American politician (d. 1878)
1826 – Cyrus K. Holliday, American businessman (d. 1900)
1837 – John Burroughs, American botanist and author (d. 1921)
1842 – Ulric Dahlgren, American colonel (d. 1864)
1848 – Arturo Prat, Chilean lawyer and captain (d. 1879)
1852 – Talbot Baines Reed, English author (d. 1893)
1858 – Jacob Gaudaur, Canadian rower (d. 1937)
1860 – Frederik van Eeden, Dutch psychiatrist and author (d. 1932)
1864 – Emil Kellenberger, Swiss target shooter (d. 1943)
1875 – Mistinguett, French actress and singer (d. 1956)
1876 – Margaret Anglin, Canadian actress, director, and producer (d. 1958)
  1876   – Tomáš Baťa, Czech businessman, founded Bata Shoes (d. 1932)
1880 – Otto Weininger, Jewish-Austrian philosopher and author (d. 1903)
1881 – Alcide De Gasperi, Italian journalist and politician, 30th Prime Minister of Italy (d. 1954)
1882 – Philippe Desranleau, Canadian archbishop (d. 1952)
1883 – Ikki Kita, Japanese philosopher and author (d. 1937)
1885 – Allan Dwan, Canadian-American director, producer, and screenwriter (d. 1981)
  1885   – Bud Fisher, American cartoonist (d. 1954)
  1885   – Marie-Victorin Kirouac, Canadian botanist and academic (d. 1944)
  1885   – St John Philby, English colonial and explorer (d. 1960)
1886 – Dooley Wilson, American actor and singer (d. 1953)
1887 – Ōtori Tanigorō, Japanese sumo wrestler, the 24th Yokozuna (d. 1956)
  1887   – Nishizō Tsukahara, Japanese admiral (d. 1966)
1888 – Thomas C. Kinkaid, American admiral (d. 1972)
1889 – Grigoraș Dinicu, Romanian violinist and composer (d. 1949)
1893 – Leslie Howard, English actor (d. 1943)
1895 – Mario Castelnuovo-Tedesco, Italian-American composer and educator (d. 1968)
  1895   – Zez Confrey, American pianist and composer (d. 1971)
1897 – Joe Kirkwood Sr., Australian golfer (d. 1970)
  1897   – Thrasyvoulos Tsakalotos, Greek general (d. 1989)
1898 – David Jack, English footballer and manager (d. 1958)
  1898   – George Jessel, American actor, singer, and producer (d. 1981)
  1898   – Henry Luce, American publisher, co-founded Time magazine (d. 1967)
1900 – Camille Chamoun, Lebanese lawyer and politician, 7th President of Lebanon (d. 1987)
  1900   – Albert Walsh, Canadian lawyer and politician, 1st Lieutenant Governor of Newfoundland (d. 1958)

1901–present
  1903   – Kamaladevi Chattopadhyay, Indian social reformer and freedom fighter (d. 1988)
1904 – Iron Eyes Cody, American actor and stuntman (d. 1999)
  1904   – Sally Rand, American dancer (d. 1979)
  1904   – Russel Wright, American furniture designer (d. 1976)
1905 – Robert Sink, American general (d. 1965)
1909 – Stanislaw Ulam, Polish-American mathematician and academic (d. 1984)
1910 – Ted Hook, Australian public servant (d. 1990)
1911 – Nanette Bordeaux, Canadian-American actress (d. 1956)
  1911   – Michael Woodruff, English-Scottish surgeon and academic (d. 2001)
  1911   – Stanisława Walasiewicz, Polish-American runner (d. 1980)
1912 – Dorothy Eden, New Zealand-English author (d. 1982)
  1912   – Grigoris Lambrakis, Greek physician and politician (d. 1963)
1913 – Per Borten, Norwegian politician, 18th Prime Minister of Norway (d. 2005)
1914 – Ray Getliffe, Canadian ice hockey player (d. 2008)
  1914   – Sam Manekshaw, Indian field marshal (d. 2008)
1915 – Piet de Jong, Dutch politician and naval officer, Prime Minister of the Netherlands (d. 2016)
  1915   – İhsan Doğramacı, Turkish physician and academic (d. 2010)
1916 – Herb Caen, American journalist and author (d. 1997)
  1916   – Cliff Gladwin, English cricketer (d. 1988)
  1916   – Louis Guglielmi, Catalan composer (d. 1991)
1918 – Mary Anderson, American actress (d. 2014)
  1918   – Louis Applebaum, Canadian composer and conductor (d. 2000)
1919 – Ervin Drake, American songwriter and composer (d. 2015)
  1919   – Clairette Oddera, French-Canadian actress and singer (d. 2008)
1920 – Stan Freeman, American composer and conductor (d. 2001)
  1920   – Yoshibayama Junnosuke, Japanese sumo wrestler, the 43rd Yokozuna (d. 1977)
1921 – Robert Karvelas, American actor (d. 1991)
  1921   – Jan Sterling, American actress (d. 2004)
1922 – Yevhen Bulanchyk, Ukrainian hurdler (d. 1996)
  1922   – Doris Day, American singer and actress (d. 2019)
1923 – Daniel Hoffman, American poet and academic (d. 2013)
1924 – Marlon Brando, American actor and director (d. 2004)
  1924   – Roza Shanina, Russian sergeant and sniper (d. 1945)
1925 – Tony Benn, English pilot and politician, Secretary of State for Industry (d. 2014)
1926 – Alex Grammas, American baseball player, manager, and coach (d. 2019)
  1926   – Gus Grissom, American colonel, pilot, and astronaut (d. 1967)
  1927   – Wesley A. Brown, American general and engineer (d. 2012)
1928 – Don Gibson, American singer-songwriter and guitarist (d. 2003)
  1928   – Emmett Johns, Canadian priest, founded Dans la Rue (d. 2018)
  1928   – Earl Lloyd, American basketball player and coach (d. 2015)
  1928   – Jennifer Paterson, English chef and television personality (d. 1999)
1929 – Fazlur Rahman Khan, Bangladeshi engineer and architect, co-designed the Willis Tower and John Hancock Center (d. 1982)
  1929   – Poul Schlüter, Danish lawyer and politician, 37th Prime Minister of Denmark (d. 2021)
1930 – Lawton Chiles, American soldier, lawyer, and politician, 41st Governor of Florida (d. 1998)
  1930   – Helmut Kohl, German politician, Chancellor of Germany (d. 2017)
  1930   – Mario Benjamín Menéndez, Argentinian general and politician (d. 2015)
  1930   – Wally Moon, American baseball player and coach (d. 2018)
1931 – William Bast, American screenwriter and author (d. 2015)
1933 – Bob Dornan, American politician
  1933   – Rod Funseth, American golfer (d. 1985)
1934 – Pamela Allen, New Zealand children's writer and illustrator 
  1934   – Jane Goodall, English primatologist and anthropologist
  1934   – Jim Parker, American football player (d. 2005)
1936 – Jimmy McGriff, American organist and bandleader (d. 2008)
  1936   – Harold Vick, American saxophonist and flute player (d. 1987)
1938 – Jeff Barry, American singer-songwriter, and producer
  1938   – Phil Rodgers, American golfer (d. 2018)
1939 – François de Roubaix, French composer (d. 1975)
  1939   – Hawk Taylor, American baseball player and coach (d. 2012)
  1939   – Paul Craig Roberts, American economist and politician
1941 – Jan Berry, American singer-songwriter (d. 2004)
  1941   – Philippé Wynne, American soul singer (d. 1984)
1942 – Marsha Mason, American actress 
  1942   – Wayne Newton, American singer 
  1942   – Billy Joe Royal, American singer-songwriter and guitarist (d. 2015)
1943 – Mario Lavista, Mexican composer
  1943   – Jonathan Lynn, English actor, director, and screenwriter
  1943   – Richard Manuel, Canadian singer-songwriter and pianist (d. 1986)
  1943   – Hikaru Saeki, Japanese admiral, the first female star officer of the Japan Self-Defense Forces
1944 – Peter Colman, Australian biologist and academic
  1944   – Tony Orlando, American singer 
1945 – Doon Arbus, American author and journalist
  1945   – Bernie Parent, Canadian ice hockey player and coach
  1945   – Catherine Spaak, French actress (d. 2022) 
1946 – Nicholas Jones, English actor
  1946   – Dee Murray, English bass player (d. 1992)
  1946   – Hanna Suchocka, Polish politician, Prime Minister of Poland
1947 – Anders Eliasson, Swedish composer (d. 2013)
1948 – Arlette Cousture, Canadian author and screenwriter
  1948   – Jaap de Hoop Scheffer, Dutch academic, politician, and diplomat, 11th Secretary General of NATO
  1948   – Hans-Georg Schwarzenbeck, German footballer
  1948   – Carlos Salinas de Gortari, Mexican economist and politician, 53rd President of Mexico
1949 – Lyle Alzado, American football player and actor (d. 1992)
  1949   – A. C. Grayling, English philosopher and academic
  1949   – Richard Thompson, English singer-songwriter and guitarist
1950 – Indrajit Coomaraswamy, Sri Lankan cricketer and economist
1951 – Brendan Barber, English trade union leader
  1951   – Annette Dolphin, British academician and educator 
  1951   – Mitch Woods, American singer-songwriter and pianist
1952 – Mike Moore, American lawyer and politician
1953 – Sandra Boynton, American author and illustrator
  1953   – Wakanohana Kanji II, Japanese sumo wrestler, the 56th Yokozuna
  1953   – James Smith, American boxer
1954 – Elisabetta Brusa, Italian composer
  1954   – K. Krishnasamy, Indian physician and politician
1956 – Kalle Kulbok, Estonian politician
  1956   – Boris Miljković, Serbian director and producer
  1956   – Miguel Bosé, Spanish musician and actor
  1956   – Ray Combs, American game show host (d. 1996)
1958 – Alec Baldwin, American actor, comedian, producer and television host
  1958   – Adam Gussow, American scholar, musician, and memoirist
  1958   – Francesca Woodman, Jewish-American photographer (d. 1981)
1959 – David Hyde Pierce, American actor and activist 
1960 – Arjen Anthony Lucassen, Dutch singer-songwriter, guitarist, and producer 
1961 – Tim Crews, American baseball player (d. 1993)
  1961   – Eddie Murphy, American actor and comedian
1962 – Dave Miley, American baseball player and manager
  1962   – Mike Ness, American singer-songwriter and guitarist 
  1962   – Jaya Prada, Indian actress and politician
1963 – Les Davidson, Australian rugby league player
  1963   – Ricky Nixon, Australian footballer and manager
  1963   – Criss Oliva, American guitarist and songwriter (d. 1993)
1964 – Marco Ballotta, Italian footballer and manager
  1964   – Nigel Farage, English politician
  1964   – Claire Perry, English banker and politician
  1964   – Bjarne Riis, Danish cyclist and manager
  1964   – Andy Robinson, English rugby player and coach
  1964   – Jay Weatherill, Australian politician, 45th Premier of South Australia
1965 – Nazia Hassan, Pakistani pop singer-songwriter, lawyer and social activist (d. 2000)
1966 – John de Vries, Australian race car driver
1967 – Cat Cora, American chef and author
  1967   – Pervis Ellison, American basketball player
  1967   – Brent Gilchrist, Canadian ice hockey player
  1967   – Cristi Puiu, Romanian director and screenwriter
  1967   – Mark Skaife, Australian race car driver and sportscaster
1968 – Sebastian Bach, Bahamian-Canadian singer-songwriter and actor 
  1968   – Charlotte Coleman, English actress (d. 2001)
  1968   – Jamie Hewlett, English director and performer
  1968   – Tomoaki Kanemoto, Japanese baseball player
1969 – Rodney Hampton, American football player
  1969   – Peter Matera, Australian footballer and coach
  1969   – Ben Mendelsohn, Australian actor
  1969   – Lance Storm, Canadian wrestler and trainer
1971 – Vitālijs Astafjevs, Latvian footballer and manager
  1971   – Emmanuel Collard, French race car driver
  1971   – Picabo Street, American skier
1972 – Jennie Garth, American actress and director
  1972   – Catherine McCormack, English actress
  1972   – Sandrine Testud, French tennis player
1973 – Nilesh Kulkarni, Indian cricketer
  1973   – Adam Scott, American actor
1974 – Marcus Brown, American basketball player
  1974   – Drew Shirley, American guitarist and songwriter 
  1974   – Lee Williams, Welsh model and actor
1975 – Shawn Bates, American ice hockey player
  1975   – Michael Olowokandi, Nigerian-American basketball player
  1975   – Aries Spears, American comedian and actor
  1975   – Yoshinobu Takahashi, Japanese baseball player
  1975   – Koji Uehara, Japanese baseball player
1976 – Nicolas Escudé, French tennis player
1978 – Matthew Goode, English actor
  1978   – Tommy Haas, German-American tennis player
  1978   – John Smit, South African rugby player
1979 – Simon Black, Australian footballer and coach
1980 – Andrei Lodis, Belarusian footballer
  1980   – Megan Rohrer, American pastor and transgender activist
1981 – Aaron Bertram, American trumpet player 
  1981   – DeShawn Stevenson, American basketball player
1982 – Jared Allen, American football player
  1982   – Iain Fyfe, Australian footballer
  1982   – Cobie Smulders, Canadian actress
1983 – Ben Foster, English footballer
  1983   – Stephen Weiss, Canadian ice hockey player
1984 – Jonathan Blondel, Belgian footballer
  1984   – Maxi López, Argentinian footballer
1985 – Jari-Matti Latvala, Finnish race car driver
  1985   – Leona Lewis, English singer-songwriter and producer
1986 – Amanda Bynes, American actress
  1986   – Stephanie Cox, American soccer player
  1986   – Annalisa Cucinotta, Italian cyclist
  1986   – Sergio Sánchez Ortega, Spanish footballer
1987 – Rachel Bloom, American actress, writer, and producer
  1987   – Jay Bruce, American baseball player
  1987   – Yileen Gordon, Australian rugby league player
  1987   – Jason Kipnis, American baseball player
  1987   – Martyn Rooney, English sprinter
  1987   – Julie Sokolow, American singer-songwriter and guitarist
  1987   – Yuval Spungin, Israeli footballer
1988 – Kam Chancellor, American football player
  1988   – Brandon Graham, American football player
  1988   – Peter Hartley, English footballer
  1988   – Tim Krul, Dutch footballer
1989 – Romain Alessandrini, French footballer
  1989   – Israel Folau, Australian rugby player and footballer
  1989   – Joel Romelo, Australian rugby league player
  1989   – Thisara Perera, Sri Lankan cricketer
1990 – Karim Ansarifard, Iranian footballer
  1990   – Madison Brengle, American tennis player
  1990   – Sotiris Ninis, Greek footballer
  1990   – Natasha Negovanlis, Canadian actress and singer
1991 – Hayley Kiyoko, American actress and singer 
1992 – Simone Benedetti, Italian footballer
  1992   – Yuliya Yefimova, Russian swimmer
1993 – Pape Moussa Konaté, Senegalese footballer
1994 – Kodi Nikorima, New Zealand rugby league player
1996 – Mayo Hibi, Japanese tennis player
1997 – Gabriel Jesus, Brazilian footballer
1998 – Paris Jackson, American actress, model and singer
1999 – Chanel Harris-Tavita, New Zealand-Samoan rugby league player

Deaths

Pre-1600
 963 – William III, Duke of Aquitaine (b. 915)
1153 – al-Adil ibn al-Sallar, vizier of the Fatimid Caliphate
1171 – Philip of Milly, seventh Grand Master of the Knights Templar (b. c. 1120)
1203 – Arthur I, Duke of Brittany (b. 1187)
1253 – Saint Richard of Chichester
1287 – Pope Honorius IV (b. 1210)
1325 – Nizamuddin Auliya, Sufi saint (b. 1238)
1350 – Odo IV, Duke of Burgundy (b. 1295)
1538 – Elizabeth Boleyn, Countess of Wiltshire (b. 1480)
1545 – Antonio de Guevara, Spanish chronicler and moralist (b. 1481)

1601–1900
1606 – Charles Blount, 8th Baron Mountjoy, English general and politician, Lord Lieutenant of Ireland (b. 1563)
1630 – Christopher Villiers, 1st Earl of Anglesey, English noble (b. c.  1593)
1637 – Joseph Yuspa Nördlinger Hahn, German rabbi
1680 – Shivaji, Indian emperor, founded the Maratha Empire (b. 1630)
1682 – Bartolomé Esteban Murillo, Spanish painter and educator (b. 1618)
1691 – Jean Petitot, French-Swiss painter (b. 1608)
1695 – Melchior d'Hondecoeter, Dutch painter (b. 1636)
1717 – Jacques Ozanam, French mathematician and academic (b. 1640)
1728 – James Anderson, Scottish lawyer and historian (b. 1662)
1792 – George Pocock, English admiral (b. 1706)
1804 – Jędrzej Kitowicz, Polish priest, historian, and author (b. 1727)
1826 – Reginald Heber, English priest (b. 1783)
1827 – Ernst Chladni, German physicist and academic (b. 1756)
1838 – François Carlo Antommarchi, French physician and author (b. 1780)
1844 – Edward Bigge, English cleric, 1st Archdeacon of Lindisfarne (b. 1807)
1846 – William Braine, English soldier and explorer (b. 1814)
1849 – Juliusz Słowacki, Polish-French poet and playwright (b. 1809)
1868 – Franz Berwald, Swedish composer and surgeon (b. 1796)
1880 – Felicita Vestvali, German actress and opera singer (b. 1831)
1882 – Jesse James, American criminal and outlaw (b. 1847)
1897 – Johannes Brahms, German pianist and composer (b. 1833)

1901–present
1901 – Richard D'Oyly Carte, English composer and talent agent (b. 1844)
1902 – Esther Hobart Morris, American lawyer and judge (b. 1814)
1930 – Emma Albani, Canadian-English operatic soprano  (b. 1847)
1936 – Richard Hauptmann, German-American murderer (b. 1899)
1941 – Tachiyama Mineemon, Japanese sumo wrestler, the 22nd Yokozuna (b. 1877)
  1941   – Pál Teleki, Hungarian academic and politician, 22nd Prime Minister of Hungary (b. 1879)
1943 – Conrad Veidt, German actor, director, and producer (b. 1893)
1946 – Masaharu Homma, Japanese general (b. 1887)
1950 – Kurt Weill, German-American composer and pianist (b. 1900)
  1950   – Carter G. Woodson, American historian, author, and journalist, founded Black History Month (b. 1875)
1951 – Henrik Visnapuu, Estonian poet and playwright (b. 1890)
1952 – Miina Sillanpää, Finnish minister and politician (b. 1866)
1957 – Ned Sparks, Canadian-American actor (b. 1883)
1958 – Jaan Kärner, Estonian poet and author (b. 1891)
1962 – Manolis Kalomiris, Greek composer and educator (b. 1883)
1970 – Avigdor Hameiri, Israeli author (b. 1890)
1971 – Joseph Valachi, American gangster (b. 1904)
1972 – Ferde Grofé, American pianist and composer (b. 1892)
1975 – Mary Ure, Scottish-English actress (b. 1933)
1976 – David M. Dennison, American physicist and academic (b. 1900)
  1976   – Claude-Henri Grignon, Canadian journalist and politician (b. 1894)
1978 – Ray Noble, English bandleader, composer, and actor (b. 1903)
  1978   – Winston Sharples, American composer (b. 1909)
1981 – Juan Trippe, American businessman, founded Pan American World Airways (b. 1899)
1982 – Warren Oates, American actor (b. 1928)
1983 – Jimmy Bloomfield, English footballer and manager (b. 1934)
1986 – Peter Pears, English tenor and educator (b. 1910)
1987 – Tom Sestak, American football player (b. 1936)
1988 – Milton Caniff, American cartoonist (b. 1907)
1990 – Sarah Vaughan, American singer (b. 1924)
1991 – Charles Goren, American bridge player and author (b. 1901)
  1991   – Graham Greene, English novelist, playwright, and critic (b. 1904)
1993 – Pinky Lee, American television host (b. 1907)
1994 – Frank Wells, American businessman (b. 1932)
1995 – Alfred J. Billes, Canadian businessman, co-founded Canadian Tire (b. 1902)
1996 – Ron Brown, American captain and politician, 30th United States Secretary of Commerce (b. 1941)
1998 – Mary Cartwright, English mathematician and academic (b. 1900)
1999 – Lionel Bart, English composer (b. 1930)
  1999   – Geoffrey Walsh, Canadian general (b. 1909)
2000 – Terence McKenna, American botanist and philosopher (b. 1946)
  2000   – Dina Abramowicz, Librarian and YIVO and Yiddish language expert (b. 1909)
2005 – François Gérin, Canadian lawyer and politician (b. 1944)
2007 – Nina Wang, Chinese businesswoman (b. 1937)
2008 – Hrvoje Ćustić, Croatian footballer (b. 1983)
2012 – Mingote, Spanish cartoonist and journalist (b. 1919)
  2012   – Richard Descoings, French civil servant (b. 1958)
  2012   – Govind Narain, Indian politician, 8th Governor of Karnataka (b. 1917)
  2012   – Chief Jay Strongbow, American wrestler (b. 1928)
  2012   – José María Zárraga, Spanish footballer and manager (b. 1930)
2013 – Mariví Bilbao, Spanish actress (b. 1930)
  2013   – Ruth Prawer Jhabvala, German-American author and screenwriter (b. 1927)
2014 – Régine Deforges, French author, playwright, and director (b. 1935)
  2014   – Fred Kida, American illustrator (b. 1920)
  2014   – Prince Michael of Prussia (b. 1940)
  2014   – Jovan Pavlović, Serbian metropolitan (b. 1936)
  2014   – Arthur "Guitar Boogie" Smith, American guitarist, fiddler, and composer (b. 1921)
2015 – Sarah Brady, American activist and author (b. 1942)
  2015   – Bob Burns, American drummer and songwriter (b. 1950)
  2015   – Shmuel Wosner, Austrian-Israeli rabbi and author  (b. 1913)
2016 – Cesare Maldini, Italian footballer and manager (b. 1932)
  2016   – Joe Medicine Crow, American anthropologist, historian, and author (b. 1913)
  2016   – Koji Wada, Japanese singer and songwriter (b. 1974)
2017 – Kishori Amonkar, Indian classical vocalist (b. 1931)
2021 – Stan Stephens, Canadian-American politician, 20th Governor of Montana (b. 1929)
2022 – June Brown, English actress (b. 1927)

Holidays and observances
 Christian feast day:
 Agape, Chionia, and Irene
 Burgundofara
 Luigi Scrosoppi
 Richard of Chichester
 April 3 (Eastern Orthodox liturgics)

References

External links

 BBC: On This Day
 
 Historical Events on April 3

Days of the year
April